Surf's Up! At Banzai Pipeline was a 1963 various artist record album compilation that featured recordings by The Surfaris, Dave Myers and The Surftones, The Soul Kings, Coast Continentals and Jim Waller & The Deltas. It has been re-released a couple of times since.

Background
The record was originally released on the Northridge Records label in 1963. Later the same year Reprise Records released it in both mono and stereo format with a simpler title, Surf's Up!. The only real difference between the Northridge and Reprise release was a different cover. In April, 1995, the  album was one of five re-released albums that appeared in a Sundazed ad in Billboard which also included the Hot Rod City various artist comp, and albums by Challengers, Revells and Jim Waller & the Deltas. In August that year, Billboard indicated that the re-release comp was near its completion.

In the book Pop Surf Culture: Music, Design, Film, and Fashion from the Bohemian Surf Boom by Brian Chidester and Domenic Priore, the two songs "Aqua Limbo" and "Laguna Limbo Luau" by Dave Myers were singled out as very interesting. The author remarked that Dave Meyers & the Surftones had suddenly become the ultimate exotica surf band. This was due to the shakers, rattling and vocal sounds.

Track listing

Personnel

Release history

References

Surf compilation albums
1963 compilation albums